Lake City may refer to:

Places
Lake City, Arkansas
Lake City, California (disambiguation)
Lake City, Modoc County, California
Lake City, Nevada County, California
Lake City, Colorado
Lake City, Florida
Lake City, Georgia
Lake City, Illinois
Lake City, Iowa
Lake City, Kansas
Lake City, Michigan
Lake City, Minnesota
Lake City, Pennsylvania
Lake City, South Carolina
Lake City, South Dakota
Lake City, Texas
Rocky Top, Tennessee, a town formerly named Lake City, Tennessee
Lake City, Seattle, Washington, a neighborhood district

Nickname
Lake City, as a city nickname, may also refer to any of the following cities:
Coeur d'Alene, Idaho
Lake Charles, Louisiana
Lohja, Finland
Plattsburgh, New York

Other uses
Lake City (film), a 2008 American drama film
Lake City Army Ammunition Plant
Lake City Way station, a SkyTrain station often referred to as "Lake City" in official notices and signage

See also
Lake (disambiguation)
Lake Town (disambiguation)
Salt Lake City, Utah
City of Lakes (disambiguation)